Bank OZK (Nasdaq: OZK) is a regional bank established in 1903. Bank OZK conducts banking operations with over 240 offices in eight states including Arkansas, Georgia, Florida, North Carolina, Texas, New York, California and Mississippi and had $27.66 billion in total assets as of December 31, 2022.

History
Bank OZK began with a community bank in Jasper, Arkansas in 1903, expanding to a second location in Ozark, Arkansas in 1937.

George Gleason, a lawyer specializing in banking at the Rose Law Firm, bought Bank of Ozark in 1979 when it had $28 million in assets and changed its name to Bank of the Ozarks. In 1994 the bank had five locations but began expanding. The headquarters moved to Little Rock in 1995.

In 2004, Bank of the Ozarks was the state's third-largest bank with 41 locations, with plans to double that number within the state, and to add full-service branches in Texas and North Carolina, where loan offices had already opened. In Texas, the bank was paying $2.2 million for an excess charter after the purchase of Sun Bank by Happy Bancshares Inc. of Happy, Texas. In addition to $2 million in deposits, the charter would allow the bank to open new branches in the Dallas area.
 
In December 2008, Bank of the Ozarks moved into a 112,000-square-foot 4-story headquarters, designed by Reese Rowland of Polk Stanley Rowland Curzon Porter Architects on Chenal Parkway near Rahling Road. For five years the bank had rented space in the GMAC Building and Three Financial Center.

30 years after Gleason took over, his bank had $3.2 billion in assets and 72 locations, 65 in Arkansas, 6 in Texas and one in North Carolina, and 740 employees. Only four of the branches were purchases.

In 2010, Bank of the Ozarks bought four failed banks, two of those in Georgia. Unity National Bank of Cartersville with $290 million in assets was the bank's first purchase in Georgia. The bank also bought Chestatee State Bank of Dawsonville, Georgia; Horizon Bank of Bradenton, Florida; and Woodlands Bank in Bluffton, South Carolina, which had a Savannah, Georgia branch. Randy Dennis of DD&F Consulting Group called Gleason "shrewd" and "cautious" in his strategy of acquiring failed banks.

In 2011, Bank of the Ozarks acquired three more failed Georgia banks: Oglethorpe Bank of Brunswick with $210 million in assets; First Choice Community Bank of Dallas; and Park Avenue Bank of Valdosta.

In 2012, SNL Financial named Bank of the Ozarks the best performing regional bank.

In January 2013, the bank agreed to pay $64 million for First National Bank of Shelby in Shelby, North Carolina, which dated to 1874. Bank of the Ozarks would be "the dominant bank" in Cleveland County, North Carolina. This deal, plus the bank's first full-service branch on Park Road in Charlotte, would give it 15 locations and $700 million in deposits in North Carolina. By August 2014, the bank also had offices in Cornelius and Belmont.

On December 9, 2013, Bank of the Ozarks announced the $23 million acquisition of Bancshares Inc. of Houston, with $301 million in assets, $269 million in deposits and eight branches of Omnibank N.A., three in Houston, one in San Antonio and four in the Austin area.

On January 30, 2014, Bank of the Ozarks announced a $216 million merger with Summit Bancorp of Arkadelphia, the state's sixth largest bank with $1.2 billion in assets and 24 locations. This was the bank's largest merger yet.

Also in 2014, the bank announced a $228.5 million deal to acquire Intervest Bancshares Corp. of Pinellas County, Florida, with seven offices, six in Florida, $1.6 billion in assets and $1.3 billion in deposits. The bank had four Florida locations, in Manatee County.

On May 6, 2015, a $64.7 million deal was announced with Bank of the Carolinas of Mocksville, North Carolina. The deal would give Bank of the Ozarks 24 locations in North Carolina, up from 16, and its first presence in the Piedmont Triad. The bank's North Carolina deposits would increase from $596.2 million to $963.7 million, making it the state's 19th largest bank. Total branches would increase to 171.

On October 19, 2015, Bank of the Ozarks announced an agreement to acquire Community & Southern Bank (as well as its holding company Community & Southern Holdings, Inc.) in an all-stock transaction valued at approximately $799.6 million; it was also agreed that, after the transaction's completion, Community & Southern Holdings, Inc. (CSB) would merge into Bank of the Ozarks, Inc. (OZRK) and CSB's wholly-owned subsidiary, Community & Southern Bank, would merge into OZRK's wholly-owned subsidiary, Bank of the Ozarks.
This acquisition, both in total assets and in purchase price, is the largest ever by an Arkansas bank. The mergers were complete on July 20, 2016.

On November 9, 2015, a $402.5-million acquisition and merging deal was announced with C1 Financial, Inc. Upon the closing of the transaction, C1 Financial, Inc. was set to merge into Bank of the Ozarks, Inc. while C1's wholly-owned subsidiary C1 Bank, would merge into Bank of the Ozarks. The transaction was closed and mergers completed on July 21, 2016. This transaction was the bank's fifteenth acquisition since March, 2010.

A name change was announced March 16, 2018 to reflect the bank's substantial and expanding regional footprint from Texas to North Carolina. After a vote on the change was made on May 7, the new name Bank OZK became official on July 16, 2018.

Following large earnings increases in 2021 as the economy recovered from the COVID-19 pandemic, Bank OZK's board of directors announced in July 2021 a year-long share repurchase of up to $300 million of outstanding common stock.

In August 2021, Bank OZK announced that it would close its retail banking branch at Rockefeller Plaza in New York City, effective September 2021, therefore eliminating its sole retail banking presence in the state.

References

External links 
 

American companies established in 1903
Banks established in 1903
Companies based in Little Rock, Arkansas
Companies listed on the Nasdaq
Banks based in Arkansas
Companies based in Arkansas